Upul is a Sri Lankan male given name. Notable people with this name include:

 Upul Chandana, Sri Lankan cricket player
 Upul Fernando (born 1973), Sri Lankan cricket player
 Upul Galappaththi (born 1979), Sri Lankan physician and politician
 Upul Indrasiri (born 1982), Sri Lankan cricket player
 Upul Liyanage, Sri Lankan politician
 Upul Mahendra (born 1971), Sri Lankan politician
 Upul Sumathipala (born 1959), Sri Lankan cricket player
 Upul Tharanga, Sri Lankan cricket player

Sinhalese masculine given names